The 1960–61 Iraq Central FA First Division Cup was the 13th season of the Iraq Central FA League (the top division of football in Baghdad and its neighbouring cities from 1948 to 1973). It was played as a double-elimination tournament. Maslahat Naqil Al-Rukab won their second title by beating Montakhab Al-Shorta 1–0 in the final.

Final positions

First round

Second round

Winners bracket

Losers bracket

Al-Athori eliminated

Al-Filiya eliminated

Al-Numan eliminated

Third round

Losers bracket

The match originally ended as a 3–2 win for Isalat Al-Mai but was later awarded as a win for Al-Quwa Al-Jawiya due to Isalat Al-Mai fielding the ineligible player Salim Hassan
Isalat Al-Mai eliminated

Amanat Al-Asima eliminated

Al-Kuliya Al-Askariya eliminated

Semi-finals

Winners bracket

Losers bracket

Al-Sikak Al-Hadeed eliminated

Al-Quwa Al-Jawiya eliminated

Final

Bracket

References

External links
 Iraqi Football Website

Iraq Central FA League seasons
Iraq
1960 in Iraqi sport
1961 in Iraqi sport